Dean Victor Horrix (21 November 1961 – 11 March 1990), was an English footballer.

He joined Millwall as a striker and made 65 league appearances plus 7 as substitute, scoring 19 goals, in the Football League Third Division. He was sold to Gillingham in 1983 and joined Reading later the same year. He formed a successful striking partnership with Trevor Senior and was very popular with the fans, helping the Royals win promotion to the Third Division in 1984 and the Second Division in 1986. He was also part of the team that won the Full Members' Cup in 1988, but were relegated from the Second Division in the same season. He then rejoined Millwall, who had just reached the Football League First Division, but was unable to break up the partnership of Tony Cascarino and Teddy Sheringham, and played just 11 league games in 18 months.

Horrix was sold to Bristol City in March 1990, but died the following week in a car crash in Berkshire. He had played just three games for the club, who were on the verge of promotion to the Second Division, and was still living in the Tadley area.

His wife Carol was driving the car but survived.

References
General
 Profile at millwall-history.co.uk
 Reading profile

Specific

1961 births
1990 deaths
English footballers
Gillingham F.C. players
Millwall F.C. players
Reading F.C. players
Cardiff City F.C. players
Bristol City F.C. players
Road incident deaths in England
Association football forwards
People from Tadley
People from Burnham-on-Sea